Soongsil University (SSU) is the first modern university in Korea, dating its history back to 1897. It was founded under the Christian missionary William M. Baird. The campus is located in 369 Sangdo-ro, Dongjak-gu, Seoul, South Korea.

History 
Soongsil University was founded on October 10, 1897, in Pyongyang as a private school by William M. Baird, a missionary of the Presbyterian Church in the U.S.A. Board of Foreign Missions. In 1900 the school was developed into an official 4-year junior high school. In October 1901 the school was named Soongsil Hakdang (Soongsil Academy). The name Soongsil roughly means "Revering [God] ( soong) with Truth and Integrity ( sil)".

In 1905 the academy established courses for students. In 1906 the academy again was permitted by presbyterian and Methodist missionary bodies to establish a university department. The academy was called Union Christian College (합성숭실대학), which was later authorized as a university by the Korean government in 1907.

In 1925 the school was forcibly reduced to a 4-year technical school of humanities named  (崇實專門學校, pronounced Sūjitsu Senmon Gakkō in Japanese). On March 4, 1938 the school closed itself in order to protest against the enforcement of Shinto shrine worship.

In August 1945 Korea was liberated from Japanese colonialism, but the effort to restore the Soongsil College did not succeed until after the end of the Korean War. In April 1954 Soongsil College was reestablished in South Korea and in June 1957 it moved to the present-day Sangdo-dong Campus. In 1971 the College was merged with Daejun College (not to be confused with  present-day Daejeon University) into Soongjun College. In December 1971 the College acquired a university status. In December 1982, Daejeon Campus of Soongjun University was separated and renamed Hannam University. In November 1986, Soongjun University was renamed Soongsil University.

Reputation 
Soongsil is a private Christian University located in the heart of Seoul. It has a low acceptance rate and a high admission barrier. Students must reach within 5~7% in the Korean SAT to be accepted within the most competitive majors such as business and global commerce. Soongsil's IT, economic, business, and social welfare majors are considered especially strong. Its business school has the 10th biggest number of alumni with CPAs. Its computer science field, which Soongsil was a pioneer in Korea, is currently ranked second after Seoul National University. This gives the graduates a much better opportunity in landing a job at the biggest IT giants such as Samsung, Google, and LG. Social welfare program at Soongsil University has high reputation in Korea as a leading institution of social work education, retaining unchanged high ranking in social work education evaluation for decades. According to a ranking made by JoongAng Ilbo, a Korean newspaper, it regularly ranks within the top 20 best universities.

International students 
Soongsil University is home to a large community of foreign students, partly due to its "Vision 2020" plan, which aims to substantially increase its foreign clientele.

The university is surrounded by bars, karaoke and restaurants, the gathering place of the international community is located at the "C-Bomb" bar.

An alcoholic beverage, the Taximansi (contraction of "taxi" and "calamansi") created by a foreign student is now a symbol of Soongsil's student culture.

Foreign students are welcomed by "SISO" (Soongsil International Student Organization) a student organization aimed at helping foreigners throughout their stay. Soongsil students who volunteer as members of SISO are selected through a vigorous vetting process.

Undergraduate schools 
 College of Humanities
 College of Natural Sciences
 College of Law
 College of Social Sciences
 College of Economics & Global Commerce
 College of Business Administration
 College of Engineering
 College of Information Technology
 Baird University College (College of Core & Specialized Education)
 School of Finance

Graduate schools 
 General Graduate School
 Special Graduate Schools
 Graduate School of Industry
 Graduate School of Small Business
 Graduate School of Information Sciences
 Graduate School of Labor & Industrial Relations
 Graduate School of Social Welfare
 Graduate School of Education
 Graduate School of Christian Studies
 Graduate School of Global Business

Institutes 
 Library and Center for Academic Information
 The Korean Christian Museum
 Educational Institutes
 Continuing Education Institute
 Soongsil Language Institute
 Youth Education Institute
 Research Institutes
 Institute of Korean Christian Culture
 Institute of Humanities
 Institute of Future Technology
 Institute of Legal Studies
 Institute of Natural Sciences
 Institute for Business & Economic Strategies
 Center for Computer Aided Molecular Design Research
 Institute of Social Sciences
 Institute of Information and Media Technology
 Project Management Center
 Center for Small & Medium Business Industrial and Academic Cooperation
 Institute of High-Tech IT Convergence
 Institute for the Gifted & Talented
 Business Institute of Information Science
 Institute of Korea Lifelong Education & HRD
 Center for Regional Innovation
 Institute of Management Innovation and Evaluation
 Institute of Social Welfare
 Institute of Underwater Acoustic Communication
 Institute of Korean Traditional Literature and Art
 Center for Ubiquitous Network Research
 Center for Electronic Microsystem Packaging
 Center for University & Industrial Cooperative IT Training and Education
 Institute of Cultural Content Technology
 IT Center for Sensory Research
 Institute of Cultural Missionary Work
 Institute of Small Business Creation and Management
 Institute of Artificial Intelligence Robot Development
 Soongsil Institute of Christian Counsels
 Institute of Industrial Economics Research

Notable people 
Park Won-sang, actor
Park Joo-Ho, footballer
Park Moon-Seong, commentator

References

External links 

 Official Website 
 Official Website 

 
Universities and colleges in Seoul
Educational institutions established in 1897
Private universities and colleges in South Korea
Association of Christian Universities and Colleges in Asia
1897 establishments in Korea
Dongjak District